Kupwara district is one of the 10 districts located in the Kashmir Valley Division of Indian administered Kashmir. The talri river (originating in lolab valley and flowing from east to west) and Mawar river are two main rivers in the district. Both of them meet Jhelum river in Baramulla district.

History
The district was carved out of the erstwhile Baramulla district in 1979 with Kupwara as the district headquarters.

Geography
The district is bordered by Bandipora district in the east, Baramulla district to the south and Pakistan administered Jammu and Kashmir to the north and west. The district is mostly rural/agricultural.

Adjacent districts
 Bandipora district, Indian administered Kashmir – east
 Neelum district, Pakistan administered Jammu and Kashmir – northeast
 Neelum district, Pakistan administered Jammu and Kashmir – northwest
 Muzaffarabad district and Hattian Bala district, Pakistan administered Jammu and Kashmir – west
 Baramulla district, Indian administered Kashmir – south

Economy
Most of the people depend on agriculture and horticulture. There is a good production and business of walnuts in Kupwara.

Department of horticulture have developed high density walnut nursery in Kupwara

Demographics

According to the 2011 census Kupwara district has a population of 870,354. This gives it a ranking of 470th in India (out of a total of 640). Its population growth rate over the decade 2001–2011 was 34.62%. Kupwara has a sex ratio of 843 females for every 1000 males (this varies with religion), and a literacy rate of 75.60% Scheduled Castes and Scheduled Tribes make up 0.12% and 8.08% of the population respectively.

At the time of the 2011 census, 71.11% of the population spoke Kashmiri, 14.12% Pahari, 9.21% Gujari and 2.70% Hindi as their first language. Urdu is widely-spoken as a second language.

Transportation

Air
The nearest airport is Sheikh ul-Alam International Airport in Srinagar located 102 kilometres from district headquarters Kupwara. There are plans to construct an airport in Panzgam.

Rail
Kupwara district is not yet connected to railways. There are plans to extend the Jammu–Baramulla line up to Kupwara in the near future. The nearest railway station is Baramulla railway station located 45 kilometres from Kupwara.

Road
Kupwara is well-connected with roads and highways. The NH 701 passes through Kupwara district alongside other intra-district roads.

See also
Jammu and Kashmir
Kupwara
Lolab Valley
Karnah
Drugmulla
Tangdhar
Sogam Lolab
Sports in Jammu and Kashmir
Diver Anderbugh
Bangus Valley

References

External links
 
 Lolab Valley

 
Districts of Jammu and Kashmir
Minority Concentrated Districts in India